Nder may refer to:
 Alioune Mbaye Nder (born 1969), Senegalese singer
N'Der, also spelled Nder, town in northern Senegal